Chester Eugene Francis (May 1, 1918 – January 23, 2002) was an American professional basketball player. He played in the National Basketball League for the Indianapolis Kautskys in three games during the 1945–46 season and averaged 0.7 points per game. He coached high school basketball and ran his own insurance company after his playing career.

References

1918 births
2002 deaths
United States Marine Corps personnel of World War II
American men's basketball players
Basketball coaches from Indiana
Basketball players from Indiana
Forwards (basketball)
High school basketball coaches in the United States
Indiana Hoosiers baseball players
Indiana Hoosiers men's basketball players
Indianapolis Kautskys players
People from Avon, Indiana